The 2017–18 Emporia State Lady Hornets basketball team represented Emporia State University in the 2017–18 NCAA Division II women's basketball season, which was the 44th Lady Hornets basketball season. The Lady Hornets were led by eighth-year head coach Jory Collins. The team played their home games on Slaymaker Court at William L. White Auditorium in Emporia, Kansas, the home court since 1974. Emporia State was a member of the Mid-America Intercollegiate Athletics Association.

Preseason outlook
The Lady Hornets enter the 2017–18 season after finishing with a 29–5 overall, 15–4 in conference play last season under Collins. In the previous season, the Lady Hornets finished tied for second in regular conference play, won the MIAA Basketball Tournament for the fifth consecutive year, and advanced to their sixth straight NCAA Sweet 16, which they lost to Harding Bison.

The Lady Hornets were chosen to finish third in the MIAA Preseason Coaches Poll. On October 31, 2017, the Women's Basketball Coaches Association released their preseason poll with Emporia State as the eleventh ranked team.

2017–18 Roster

Media
The Lady Hornets basketball games are broadcast on KFFX-FM, Mix 104.9.

Schedule
Source: 

|-
! colspan="12" style="" | Exhibition

|-
! colspan="12" style="" | Non-conference regular season

|-
! colspan="12" style="" | MIAA regular season

|-
! colspan="6" style="" | 2018 MIAA Tournament

Rankings

References

Emporia State Lady Hornets basketball seasons
2017 in sports in Kansas
2018 in sports in Kansas
Emporia